Lucimar Aparecida de Moura (born 22 March 1974 in Timóteo, MG) is a female track and field athlete from Brazil, who competes in the sprint events. She represented her native country at the 2004 Summer Olympics in Athens, Greece, and won the silver medal in the women's 200 metres at the 1999 Pan American Games in Winnipeg, Manitoba, Canada.

Career
At the 2008 Summer Olympics in Beijing she competed at the 100 metres sprint. In her first round heat she placed fourth behind Christine Arron, Lauryn Williams and Tahesia Harrigan, normally causing elimination. However her time of 11.60 was the seventh fastest losing time, which was enough to advance to the second round. There she failed to qualify for the semi finals as her time of 11.67 was only the eighth and last time of her heat. Together with Rosemar Coelho Neto, Thaissa Presti and Rosângela Santos she also took part in the 4 × 100 m relay. In their first round heat they placed third behind Belgium and Great Britain, but in front of Nigeria. Their time of 43.38 seconds was the fifth time overall out of sixteen participating nations. With this result they qualified for the final in which they sprinted to a time of 43.14 seconds and the fourth place behind Nigeria, missing out on the bronze medal with 0.10 seconds. However, in 2016, the IOC stripped Russia of its Gold Medal due to doping, meaning Rosângela and her teammates inherited the bronze medal.

Achievements

References

External links
 
 Profile
 

1974 births
Living people
Brazilian female sprinters
Athletes (track and field) at the 2004 Summer Olympics
Athletes (track and field) at the 2008 Summer Olympics
Olympic athletes of Brazil
Athletes (track and field) at the 1999 Pan American Games
Athletes (track and field) at the 2007 Pan American Games
Pan American Games silver medalists for Brazil
Pan American Games medalists in athletics (track and field)
Universiade medalists in athletics (track and field)
Olympic bronze medalists for Brazil
Medalists at the 2008 Summer Olympics
Olympic bronze medalists in athletics (track and field)
Universiade silver medalists for Brazil
Medalists at the 1999 Pan American Games
Olympic female sprinters
21st-century Brazilian women